Didone is an opera by Francesco Cavalli, set to a libretto by Giovanni Francesco Busenello (later librettist for Claudio Monteverdi). The opera was first performed at Venice's Teatro San Cassiano during 1640.

The plot is based on Virgil's Aeneid (Book 4 in particular), though Busenello, in his second libretto for Cavalli, replaces  Dido's tragic suicide of Virgil with a happy ending in which Dido marries Iarbas, King of the Getuli, who saves Dido from herself after Aeneas abandons her. The action is divided into a prologue and 3 acts.

Roles

Recordings
 Live Video recording on DVD - 2006 - Teatro Malibran, Venice - Fabio Biondi, conductor - Orchestra Europa GalanteCast: Claron McFadden, Magnus Staveland, Jordi Domènech, Manuela Custer, Marina De Liso, Donatella Lombardi -  Dynamic cat. 33537

See also
Dido and Aeneas

References
Sources

External links
Free score of La Didone in the International Music Score Library Project
Libretto of the opera in italian.

Operas by Francesco Cavalli
Operas
Operas based on classical mythology
1641 operas
Operas based on the Aeneid
Music based on poems
Cultural depictions of Dido
Opera world premieres at the Teatro San Cassiano
Italian-language operas